Bryan Leyva (born February 8, 1992, in Chihuahua, Chihuahua, Mexico) is a Mexican former footballer. He last played as an attacking midfielder for Dallas City FC (DCFC) of the National Premier Soccer League.

Youth career
Leyva joined the FC Dallas Development Academy in June 2008 as a member of the U-16 team. He helped lead the team to a second-place finish in that year's MLS/SUM U-17 Cup. The midfielder also had training stints with Lille OSC in France and Racing Santander in Spain.

Club career
In 2009, FC Dallas General Manager Michael Hitchcock announced that Leyva had been signed to its professional team. The signing made Leyva the first homegrown player in FC Dallas history. Over the next few years, he did not receive much playing time and was released by Dallas on November 7, 2012. After a stint in Mexico, he returned to Dallas to join lower league side, DCFC.

References

External links
 

1992 births
Living people
Association football midfielders
Expatriate soccer players in the United States
FC Dallas players
Footballers from Chihuahua
Major League Soccer players
Mexican expatriate footballers
Mexican expatriate sportspeople in the United States
Mexican footballers
Mexico youth international footballers
People from Chihuahua City
People from Irving, Texas
Soccer players from Texas
Sportspeople from the Dallas–Fort Worth metroplex
Homegrown Players (MLS)